The 2002 season of the Bhutanese A-Division was the eighth recorded season of top-flight football in Bhutan and started on 28 July 2002. The league was won by Druk Pol, their sixth title. Eleven teams took part, four from Phuentsholing and seven from Thimpu.

Rigzung won promotion from the B-Division to the A-Division.

Known results

References

Bhutan A-Division seasons
Bhutan
Bhutan
1